(Dearest Emmanuel, duke of the pious), 123, is a church cantata by Johann Sebastian Bach. He composed the chorale cantata in Leipzig for Epiphany and first performed it on 6 January 1725. It is based on the hymn by Ahasverus Fritsch (1679).

History and words 
Bach wrote the chorale cantata in his second year in Leipzig to conclude a set of Christmas cantatas on the Feast of Epiphany. The prescribed readings for the feast day were taken from the Book of Isaiah, the heathen will convert, and from the Gospel of Matthew, the Wise Men From the East bringing gifts of gold, frankincense and myrrh to the newborn Jesus. The cantata text is based on the chorale in six stanzas by Ahasverus Fritsch (1679). The unknown poet kept the first and the last stanza, and paraphrased the inner stanzas to a sequence of as many recitatives and arias. The text has no specific reference to the readings, but mentions the term  (name of Jesus), reminiscent of the naming of Jesus celebrated on 1 January. The poet inserts "" (salvation and light) as a likely reference to the Epiphany, and alludes to Christmas by "" (Jesus who came into flesh). Otherwise the cantata text follows the idea of the chorale: hate and rejection in the world cannot harm those who believe.

Bach first performed the cantata on 6 January 1725.

Scoring and structure 

The cantata in six movements is scored for three vocal soloists (alto, tenor, and bass), a four-part choir, two flauto traverso, two oboes d'amore, two violins, viola, and basso continuo.

 Chorus: 
 Recitative (alto): 
 Aria (tenor): 
 Recitative (bass): 
 Aria (bass): 
 Chorale:

Music 
In the opening chorus Bach uses the beginning of the chorale melody as an instrumental motif, first in a long introduction, then as a counterpoint to the voices. The soprano sings the cantus firmus. The lower voices are set mostly in homophony with two exceptions. The text "" (come soon) is rendered by many calls in the lower voices. The text of the final line is first sung by the bass on the melody of the first line, which alto and tenor imitate to the soprano singing the text on the melody of the last line, thus achieving a connection of beginning and end of the movement. The prominent woodwinds, two flutes and two oboes d'amore, and the 9/8 time create a pastoral mood. Albert Schweitzer said of this choir that, thanks to it, the cantata Liebster Immanuel "is one of those that one cannot forget, so simple are the harmonies and indefinable their charm."

The tenor aria, accompanied by two oboes d'amore, speaks of "" (harsh journey of the Cross), illustrated by a chromatic ritornello of four measures in constant modulation. Christoph Wolff terms the material "bizarre chromatic melodic figures". When the ritornello appears again at the end of the first section, it is calmer in the melodies, with the chromatic theme in the continuo, perhaps because the singer claims he is not frightened. In the middle section, thunderstorms are pictured "allegro" in "exuberant passage-work" of the voice, calming to "adagio" on "", the reference to the Epiphany.

The bass aria is termed by John Eliot Gardiner, who performed the cantata on the Bach Cantata Pilgrimage in the Nikolaikirche in Leipzig, as "one of the loneliest arias Bach ever wrote". The voice is only accompanied by a single flute and a "staccato" continuo. Gardiner compares the flute to "some consoling guardian angel".

The cantata is closed by an unusual four-part chorale. The Abgesang of the bar form is repeated, the repeat marked piano. The reason is likely the text which ends "" (until one day I am laid in the grave).

Recordings 
 Die Bach Kantate Vol. 21, Helmuth Rilling, Gächinger Kantorei, Bach-Collegium Stuttgart, Helen Watts, Adalbert Kraus, Philippe Huttenlocher, Hänssler 1980
 J. S. Bach: Das Kantatenwerk – Sacred Cantatas Vol. 7, Nikolaus Harnoncourt, Tölzer Knabenchor, Concentus Musicus Wien, soloist of the Tölzer Knabenchor, Kurt Equiluz, Robert Holl, Teldec 1982
 Bach Edition Vol. 3 – Cantatas Vol. 1, Pieter Jan Leusink, Holland Boys Choir, Netherlands Bach Collegium, Sytse Buwalda, Knut Schoch, Bas Ramselaar, Brilliant Classics 1999
 Bach Cantatas Vol. 18: Berlin / Weimar/Leipzig/Hamburg / For Christmas Day & for Epiphany / For the 1st Sunday after Epiphany, John Eliot Gardiner, Monteverdi Choir, English Baroque Soloists, Sally Bruce-Payne, James Gilchrist, Peter Harvey, Soli Deo Gloria 2000
 J. S. Bach: Complete Cantatas Vol. 14, Ton Koopman, Amsterdam Baroque Orchestra & Choir, Franziska Gottwald, Paul Agnew, Klaus Mertens, Antoine Marchand 2000
 J. S. Bach: Cantatas Vol. 32, Masaaki Suzuki, Bach Collegium Japan, Andreas Weller, Peter Kooy, BIS 2005
 Bach: Cantates pour la Nativité / Intégrale des cantates sacrées Vol. 4, Eric J. Milnes, Montréal Baroque, Monika Mauch, Matthew White, Charles Daniels, Harry van der Kamp, ATMA Classique 2007

References

Sources 
 
 Liebster Immanuel, Herzog der Frommen BWV 123; BC A 28 / Chorale cantata (The Epiphany) Bach Digital
 Cantata BWV 123 Liebster Immanuel, Herzog der Frommen history, scoring, sources for text and music, translations to various languages, discography, discussion, Bach Cantatas Website
 BWV 123 Liebster Immanuel, Herzog der Frommen English translation, University of Vermont
 BWV 123 Liebster Immanuel, Herzog der Frommen text, scoring, University of Alberta
 Chapter 33 BWV 123 Liebster Immanuel, Herzog der Frommen / Adored Emannuel, Prince of the Faithful.: a listener and student guide by Julian Mincham, 2010
 Luke Dahn: BWV 123.6 bach-chorales.com

Church cantatas by Johann Sebastian Bach
1725 compositions
Epiphany music
Chorale cantatas